is a Japanese skier. He competed in the Nordic combined event at the 1988 Winter Olympics.

References

External links
 

1962 births
Living people
Japanese male Nordic combined skiers
Olympic Nordic combined skiers of Japan
Nordic combined skiers at the 1988 Winter Olympics
Sportspeople from Hokkaido